In Gay Madrid (1930) is an American pre-Code musical comedy, directed by Robert Z. Leonard, starring Ramón Novarro and Dorothy Jordan, and released by Metro-Goldwyn-Mayer.

Cast
Ramon Navarro as Ricardo
Dorothy Jordan as Carmina Rivas
Lottice Howell as Goytia
Claude King as Marques de Castelar
Eugenie Besserer as Dona Generosa
William V. Mong as Rivas
Beryl Mercer as Dona Concha
Nanci Price as Jacinta
Herbert Clark as Octavio
David Scott as Ernesto
George Chandler as Enrique
Bruce Coleman as Corpulento
Nicholas Caruso as Carlos

Production
Under the working title The House of Troy, filming of In Gay Madrid began on November 14, 1929 and concluded on December 21. Some retakes were directed by Robert Ober in January 1930.

Release
In Gay Madrid was released on May 17, 1930, and was moderately successful at the boxoffice. though it was critically panned. The film's financial under-performance could, in part, be attributed to American audiences growing tired of musicals. It was paired with the comedy short, The Home Edition, starring Jay C. Flippen, in some U.S. theaters. It was released in Ottawa on June 23, 1930, along with the short Memories, a Musical Fantasy. In Gay Madrid has had a DVD release from Warner Archive in November 2015.

References

External links

1930 films
1930 musical comedy films
1930 romantic comedy films
American musical comedy films
American romantic comedy films
American romantic musical films
American black-and-white films
Films based on Spanish novels
Films based on romance novels
Films based on works by Alejandro Pérez Lugín
Films directed by Robert Z. Leonard
Metro-Goldwyn-Mayer films
1930s romantic musical films
1930s English-language films
1930s American films